The following lists events that will happen during 2015 in Poland.

Incumbents

Elections 

Bold indicates government parties.

Events

January 
 1 January –
 Chocz (Greater Poland Voivodeship) and Stopnica (Holy Cross Voivodeship) received city rights.
 Zielona Góra was enlarged by the area of Zielona Góra Gmina, hence becoming the sixth largest city by area in Poland.
 11 January – The twenty third final of the Great Orchestra of Christmas Charity took place.
 8–18 January – Coal miners held a protest in Upper Silesia.

February 
 4 February – Radosław Sikorski, Sejm Marshal, set the date of the presidential election to 10 May.
 5 February – The incumbent President, Bronisław Komorowski announced his willingness to be reelected in the upcoming election.

March 
 8 March – The first segment of the second line of the Warsaw Metro was opened.

April
 6–12 April – The 2015 Katowice Open was held in Katowice, Silesian Voivodeship.

May 
 2 May – 2015 Knurów riots
 10 May – The first round of the 2015 Polish presidential election was held. No candidate received more than half of the vote, so Bronisław Komorowski and Andrzej Duda went into the second round.
 24 May – The second round of the Polish presidential election, 2015 was held. Andrzej Duda, Law and Justice party candidate won the election over incumbent Bronisław Komorowski, receiving 51.55% of the vote.
 29 May – A tragic accident of a gyroplane occurred near Brzeg Dolny.

June 
 8 June – A whirlwind occurred in the South of Poland.

July 
 19 July – Powerful and violent storms with heavy rainfall occurred, resulting in the death of one person and the injury of fourteen others.
 23 July – Irena Doroszkiewicz, as the first woman in history, was appointed Superintendent of the Police.

September 
 6 September – A referendum is held, in which voters decided on introducing single-member constituencies for Sejm elections, maintaining state financing of political parties and introducing a presumption in favour of the taxpayer in disputes over the tax law.

October 
 25 October – The 2015 Polish parliamentary election is held, to elect 460 MPs and 100 senators.

November 
 4 November – During a meeting with President of Romania Klaus Iohannis, Duda and Iohannis establish Bucharest Nine.

Deaths

January 
 1 January – Józef Hałas, Polish painter and engraver (b. 1927)
 4 January – Edmund Wnuk-Lipiński, Polish sociologist (b. 1944)
 7 January – Tadeusz Konwicki, Polish writer, screenwriter and film director (b. 1926) 
 9 January – Józef Oleksy, Polish politician, Sejm Marshal, 7th Prime Minister of Poland from 1995 to 1996 (b. 1946)
 12 January – Marcin Pawlak, Polish local government politician (b. 1950)
 29 January – Jan Skrzek, Polish musician and blues composer  (b. 1953)
 30 January – Zbigniew Kurtycz, Polish musician (b. 1919)

February 
 4 February – Karol Parno Gierliński, Polish gypsy sculptor, poet (b. 1938)
 9 February – Piotr Winczorek, Polish professor, lawyer, member of the State Tribunal (b. 1943)
 11 February – Sylwester Przedwojewski, Polish actor (b. 1920)
 12 February – Jerzy Regulski, Polish economist, politician (b. 1924)
 25 February –
 Adam Halber, Polish journalist, politician (b. 1948)
 Zbigniew Kalemba, Polish composer, pianist, conductor, teacher (b. 1936)
 Marian Szeja, Polish soccer player, gold medallist at the 1972 Summer Olympics in Munich, Germany (b. 1941)
 27 February – Bohdan Tomaszewski, Polish journalist and sports commentator, tennis player (b. 1921)

March 
 6 March – Janusz Kałużny, Polish astronomist (b. 1955)
 10 March – Agnieszka Kotlarska, Polish actor (b. 1971)

April 
 1 April – Robert Leszczyński, Polish journalist, music critic, guitarist (b. 1967)
 2 April – Barbara Sass, Polish film director (b. 1936)
 21 April – Jan Matyjaszkiewicz, Polish actor (b. 1929)
 24 April – Władysław Bartoszewski,  former Minister of Foreign Affairs and Auschwitz survivor (b. 1922)

May 
 3 May – Halina Dunajska, Polish actor (b. 1926)
 6 May – Włodzimierz Wilkosz, Polish actor (b. 1928)
 7 May – Fr. Józef Pazdur, Roman Catholic prelate, Bishop of Wrocław (1984-2000)  (b. 1924)
 20 May – Jan Prochyra, Polish actor (b. 1948)

June 
 1 June – Tadeusz Zawistowski, Polish Catholic priest, suffragan bishop of Łomża (b. 1930)
 4 June – Bolesław Idziak, Polish actor (b. 1928)

July 
 3 July – Krystyna Siesicka, Polish writer (b. 1928)
 8 July – Waldemar Ochnia, Polish cabaret artist (b. 1952)
 9 July – Tadeusz Suchocki, Polish pianist, composer, arranger (b. 1927)
 28 July – David Faber, Polish-American author and academic (b. 1928)

See also 
 2015 in Polish television

References 

 
2010s in Poland
Poland
Poland
Years of the 21st century in Poland